Major Alastair Lorimer Cram  (25 August 1909 – 17 March 1994) was a Scottish mountaineer, lawyer and British Army officer during the Second World War. 

Cram was born in Perth, the son of solicitor Duncan Cram. He was an outstanding athlete, founding the Perth chapter of the Junior Mountaineering Club in 1930 and winning the Scottish A.A.A. half-mile championship in 1933. He was educated at Perth Academy and the University of Edinburgh, earning his LLB in 1934.  After an apprenticeship with Balfour and Manson in Edinburgh, he joined his father's firm, Mitchell & Cram, in Perth. 

Cram joined the Royal Artillery in 1939. He was taken prisoner in 1941 during the Battle of Sidi Rezegh in North Africa. He subsequently made 21 escape attempts, finally succeeding in April 1945, just one month before the end of the war in Europe. He was awarded the Military Cross for his escape efforts.

After the war, he served with the SAS and the Intelligence Corps. An excellent linguist, Cram spoke French, German, Italian, and Czech. He was stationed in Germany on intelligence duties in November 1946, serving with the War Crimes Commission. 

Following the war, he was admitted to the Faculty of Advocates in Edinburgh. In 1948, he was appointed a resident magistrate in Kenya, a senior resident magistrate in 1957 and a puisne judge in 1960. In Kenya, he played a role in questioning the treatment of detained Mau Mau rebels.

References

External links 
Bill Murray, Alastair Cram and the art of escape
The 21 Escapes of Lt Alastair Cram

1909 births
1984 deaths
Recipients of the Military Cross
Scottish soldiers
Scottish lawyers
British Kenya judges
Royal Artillery officers
World War II prisoners of war held by Italy
World War II prisoners of war held by Germany
People from Perth, Scotland
People educated at Perth Academy
Alumni of the University of Edinburgh
British Army personnel of World War II
Special Air Service officers
Intelligence Corps officers
British World War II prisoners of war
Scottish escapees
Escapees from German detention